Ten Bears (Comanche Pawʉʉrasʉmʉnurʉ)  (ca. 1790-November 23, 1872) was the principal chief of the Yamparika or "Root Eater" division of the Comanche from ca. 1860-72. He was the leader of the Ketahto ("The Barefeet") local group of the Yamparika, probably from the late 1840s.

The ethnonym (group name), Yamparika or "Root Eater" Comanche was known to the Spaniards of New Mexico as early as the 1750s, but until about 1790, they were generally north of the Arkansas River and so were seldom specifically mentioned in Spanish documents. After that time, with the advance of Cheyennes (Comanche: paka naboo 'striped arrows'), and Cuampes, likely Arapahos, some Yamparika local groups, including the Ketahto, relocated to the valley of the North Canadian River in New Mexico and Texas.

Early life 
Ten Bears was orphaned as a baby when his family group was murdered by Lakotas.  Later Comanche oral history states that in his young adult years, he was noted for leading horse-mounted spear attacks on Lakota villages.

Rise to political prominence 
Ten Bears was a key figure in making peace between the Comanches and the Utes in 1820. Ten Bears was often in rivalry with a man named either Isakwahip 'Wolf's Back', or Isakiip 'Wolf's Elbow', leader of another local group in the North Canadian valley. 
In 1840 the Yamparika chief, Ten Bears, was one among the principal promoters (together with the Kiowa chiefs Dohasan and Satank and the Arapaho Hosa Little Raven) of the peace and large alliance between the Comanche and Kiowa alliance and the Cheyenne and Arapaho alliance after the Cheyenne and Arapaho's victory at Wolf Creek during the spring 1838. To reach his purpose, Ten Bears (Parrawasamen) was able to gain the approval of such chiefs as the Kotsoteka Shaved Head (Wulea-boo) and, even through Shaved Head’s support, Big Eagle (a.k.a. Sun Eagle) (Tawaquenah), likely the Nokoni Tall Tree (Huupi-pahati) and certainly the Penateka Buffalo Hump (Pocheha-quehip, Potsʉnakwahipʉ) and Yellow Wolf (Isaviah) and probably the Kwahadi Iron Jacket (Pohebits-quasho); together with Ten Bears (Parrawasamen), probably Tawaquenah and Huupi-pahati, certainly Buffalo Hump (Pocheha-quehip) and eventually Iron Jacket (Pohebits-quasho) represented Comanche nation during the negotiation near the Two Butte Creek, resulting in a peace agreement and a strong alliance between the two groups.

Ten Bears first came to the attention of Anglo-Americans in 1853 when he, among others, signed the Treaty of Fort Atkinson. His name was written as "Parosawano" and translated as 'Ten Sticks', a confusion of /pawʉʉra/ 'bear' with /paria/ 'dogwood stick'. The error was corrected in the 1854 revision of the treaty.

Ten Bears became the principal Yamparika chief about 1860 after the death of the man known to Anglos as 'Shaved Head' (Wulea-boo, possibly a Kotsoteka rather than a Yamparika Comanche); the latter's Comanche name is uncertain as there were several men whom Anglos called by that name.

In August 1861 Ten Bears (likely being himself the chief named as “Bistevana”) signed the Fort Cobb Treaty with gen. Albert Pike, the Confederate Indian Commissioner, sanctioning an alliance with the “Gray Jackets”.

In 1863, along with a delegation of Western Indians, including Southern Cheyennes, Southern Arapahoes, and Kiowas, Ten Bears visited Washington, but he was unable to get any major concessions for his people from the U.S. government.

In November 1864, Ten Bears was the chief of the Yamparika Comanches nearest the ruins of the Bent brothers' old adobe trading post (the first Adobe Walls, Texas, built ca 1840) when troops under Col. Christopher 'Kit' Carson attacked a nearby Kiowa village . Warriors from Ten Bear's village led the counterattack which drove off Carson's men, although one of Ten Bears' sons, Ekamoksu 'Red Sleeve'  was killed.

Treaty of the Little Arkansas River 
In 1865, Ten Bears and two of his sons, Isananaka 'Wolf's Name' and Hitetetsi 'Little Crow', along with other Comanches, mostly Yamparikas, signed the Treaty of the Little Arkansas River in Kansas.

The treaty created a reservation for the Comanches encompassing the entire panhandle of Texas. This was problematic, as the Federal government did not then "own" that territory and therefore could not reserve it: the Republic of Texas was annexed to the United States in 1849, but the Republic did not recognize any native land claims within its borders — this opinion was based on a faulty reading of Spanish and Mexican law and therefore in 1865 there were no "federal" versus "state" owned lands within the boundaries of Texas which the Government could "reserve" to the Native Americans.

Medicine Lodge Treaty 
Two years later, at the October 1867 Medicine Lodge Treaty Conference, Ten Bears and other Yamparikas as well as a few other Comanches (but none of the newly emergent Kwahada division, who were delayed by sickness), agreed to a smaller reservation in western Indian territory of Oklahoma.

At that conference, Ten Bears gave an eloquent address:

Death 
A year later in December 1868, a number of Yamparika local bands, including Ten Bear's, were along the Washita River in western Indian Territory, near their allied Cheyennes and within the boundaries of the latter's reservation. When troops under Lt. Col George Armstrong Custer attacked the Cheyenne village under Black Kettle, Yamparika warriors from the village of Esarosavit 'White Wolf' joined in the counter attack, and "rode over" the detachment of Major Joel Elliot.

In 1872, Ten Bears again visited Washington, along with a delegation that included his grandson Cheevers (probably from the Spanish chiva 'goat', although Attocknie argues that it was tsii putsi 'little pitied one'), as well as other Comanches and Kiowas. But the hope that promises would be kept was ultimately futile. Ten Bears died soon after his return, November 23, 1872, at Fort Sill where he is buried.

In Popular Media 
Ten Bears, played by the Muscogee actor Will Sampson, is portrayed in the film The Outlaw Josey Wales as a Comanche chief defending his home who then makes a "live and let live" peace with the title character, portrayed by Clint Eastwood.

Sources
 Wallace, Ernest & Hoebel, E. Adamson. The Comanche: Lords of the Southern Plains, University of Oklahoma Press, Norman, 1952
 Nye, Wilbur Sturtevant. Carbine and Lance: The Story of Old Fort Sill, University of Oklahoma Press, Norman, 1983
 Leckie, William H. The Buffalo Soldiers: A Narrative of the Negro Cavalry in the West, University of Oklahoma Press, Norman, 1967
 Fowler, Arlen L. The Black Infantry in the West, 1869-1891, University of Oklahoma Press, Norman, 1996
 Brown, Dee. Bury My Heart at Wounded Knee: An Indian History of the American West, Holt, Rinehart & Winston, New York, 1970

References

Comanche people
Native American leaders
1790s births
1872 deaths
Year of birth uncertain